Eshkaft or Eshkoft may refer to:
 Eshkaft, Fars
 Eshkaft-e Rumeh, Fars Province
 Eshkaft-e Tineh Vand, Fars Province
 Eshkaft Zun, Fars Province
 Eshkaft-e Baba Mir, Khuzestan Province
 Eshkaft-e Baraftab, Khuzestan Province
 Eshkaft-e Gav, Khuzestan Province
 Eshkaft-e Jamushi, Khuzestan Province
 Eshkaft-e Khorma, Khuzestan Province
 Eshkaft-e Mana, Khuzestan Province
 Eshkaft-e Tavileh, Khuzestan Province
 Eshkaft Gav Mishi Kuh Sorkh, Kohgiluyeh and Boyer-Ahmad Province
 Eshkaft Shah-e Sofla, Kohgiluyeh and Boyer-Ahmad Province
 Eshkaft-e Dudar, Kohgiluyeh and Boyer-Ahmad Province
 Eshkaft-e Shiri, Kohgiluyeh and Boyer-Ahmad Province
 Eshkaft-e Olya Gelal, Kohgiluyeh and Boyer-Ahmad Province
 Eshkaft-e Qateri Murzard, Kohgiluyeh and Boyer-Ahmad Province
 Eshkaft-e Salman
 Eshkaft-e Siah (disambiguation)
 Eshkaft-e Siahoo
 Eshkaft-e Zard

See also
 Darreh Eshkaft (disambiguation)
 Eshgaft (disambiguation)
 Sar Eshkaft (disambiguation)